Tatum Lee-Hahn is an American politician serving as a member of the Kansas House of Representatives from the 117th district. She assumed office on October 30, 2020, succeeding Leonard Mastroni, who had died the previous month.

Prior to her appointment to the House, Lee-Hahn was the development director for R-CALF USA, a livestock company.

References 

Living people
Republican Party members of the Kansas House of Representatives
Women state legislators in Kansas
21st-century American politicians
21st-century American women politicians
Year of birth missing (living people)